The Zuari Bridge is a bridge between North Goa and South Goa, India. It carries the NH 66 over the tidal part of the Zuari River, between the villages of Agaçaim and Cortalim. It is a few metres downstream of the Konkan Railway Bridge.

Konkan Railway Bridge 

The Konkan Railway Bridge is a railway bridge between North Goa and South Goa, India. It carries the Konkan Railway over the tidal part of the Zuari River, south of Karmali railway station. The bridge was completed in three years. It is a few metres upstream of the Zuari road bridge.

Incidents in Zuari Bridge 
In 2022, a car fell off the bridge killing all 4 occupants. Demands for the audit of the bridge safety was made by the local politicians. Aam Aadmi Party, Goa president Amit Palekar, blamed the  depression near the gap  between the bridge spans near the site of the accident as the cause. He demanded the bridge to be repaired.

The New Zuari Bridge 

This is an underconstruction cable-stayed bridge over Zuari River on the Panaji–Margao stretch of the National Highway 66.It is being built by Dilip Buildcon and was partially opened for public in 2022.

This New Zuari Bridge has eight lanes (4+4). It has dual carriageways of 27 m each and has a center median of 10.7m. It is the 2nd longest and widest cable-stay bridge in India behind Bandra–Worli Sea Link

This bridge is used as an expressway between Panaji and Margao, over the Zuari river. The main bridge over the Zuari river is 640m long. And the approach roads for this bridge cover over 13 km, starting from near the Bambolim cross in North Goa to near Birla cross in South Goa.

It is expected that two towers (110 m high from water level) will be built on this bridge. It is also expected that there will be an observatory and viewing gallery, an art gallery, and also a revolving restaurant.

Right-hand side (4-lane corridor) of the bridge thrown open for Vehicular traffic by Nitin Gadkari in December 2022.

See also 
 Atal Setu, Goa
 Zuari River

References

External links
 ZuariBridge : AAP blames bad condition of the bridge for the accident

Railway bridges in India
Bridges in Goa
Konkan Railway
Buildings and structures in North Goa district
Buildings and structures in South Goa district
Transport in Panaji